Wickenburg Mountains is a mountain range located in Maricopa and Yavapai Counties in Arizona.  Denver Hill, at an altitude of 4,406 feet or 1,343 meters, is the tallest peak in the range.

References

Mountain ranges of Yavapai County, Arizona
Mountain ranges of Maricopa County, Arizona
Mountain ranges of Arizona